A leash is a restraint for pets.

Leash may also refer to:
 Child leash or harness
 Leash (BDSM), used on humans
 Leash (Pearl Jam song), a song from the 1993 album Vs.
 Surfboard leash, the cord that attaches a surfboard to the surfer
 Among hunters, a collection of three hares is called a "leash"

See also 
 Leach (disambiguation)
 Leech (disambiguation)